Wirz is a Swiss surname. Notable people with the surname include:

 George Otto Wirz (1929–2010), American Roman Catholic bishop
 Henry Wirz, American officer of the Confederate States Army
 Johann Jakob Wirz, Swiss Theosophist prophet 
 Rodolfo Wirz, Uruguayan Roman Catholic bishop
 Rudolf Wirz (1918–?), Swiss field handball player 
 Susi Wirz (born 1931), Swiss figure skater
 Valentin Wirz (born 1981), Swiss ice hockey player

German-language surnames